Horse soldiers may refer to:

 Horses in warfare
 Cavalry, soldiers who fight mounted on horseback
 Horse Soldiers, a 2009 non-fiction book by Doug Stanton
 The Horse Soldiers, a 1959 American film
 America's Response Monument (unofficially known as the Horse Soldier Statue) in New York City, New York, United States